Stroitel Football Club Pripyat, also known as Budivelnyk Football Club Pripyat was a Soviet and Ukrainian football club (team) from Pripyat, Kyiv Oblast. Founded in the 1970s, it competed only at republican level competitions in Ukraine. Before the Chernobyl disaster the team was playing at a small stadium in Prypiat. In 1986 for it there was built new home ground the Avanhard Stadium, at which the club never had a chance to play.

History
The team, whose name Stroitel means "builder", was founded in the middle of the 1970s with construction of the Chernobyl Nuclear Power Station along with the atomgrad Prypiat. The team competed at competitions of district (raion) and region (oblast). In 1981, it entered the KFK competition of Ukrainian SSR. Please note, at Soviet football league system such republican football competitions (KFK championship) in 1971–1989 were conditionally at fourth tier just below the USSR Championship Vtoraya Liga, yet republican competitions, particularly football KFK, were administered by all 15 union republics individually. Since 1978 every winner of the Ukrainian football competitions among KFK were gaining promotion and obtaining the status of teams of masters.

The highest achievement in competitions among KFK Stroitel obtained in 1985 placing second in its group. The team never qualified for the final stage of the competition. In 1981–1983, for three years in the row, Stroitel was awarded a title of the Kyiv Oblast championship champions.

Stroitel was preparing for a cup semi-final against FC Borodyanka on the day of the Chernobyl disaster, Saturday 26 April 1986. When the city of Pripyat was abandoned after the disaster, the new city of Slavutych was founded near Chernihiv at the end of the same year to replace it. The football club was moved there, changing its name to FC Stroitel Slavutych in 1987. Its activities ceased after the end of 1988 season.

Honours
Kyiv Oblast Football Championship
 '''Winners (1): 1981, 1982, 1983

League and cup history

See also
 FC Slavutych
 List of football clubs in Ukraine

References

External links
 Football in Pripyat

Fc Pripyat
Stroitel Pripyat, FC
Stroitel Pripyat, FC
Stroitel Pripyat, FC
1970s establishments in Ukraine
Association football clubs established in the 20th century
Association football clubs disestablished in 1988
1988 disestablishments in Ukraine